Noah Lindsey Beery (August 10, 1913 – November 1, 1994) was an American actor often specializing in warm, friendly character roles similar to many portrayed by his Oscar-winning uncle, Wallace Beery. Unlike his more famous uncle, however, Beery Jr. seldom broke away from playing supporting roles. Active as an actor in films or television for well over half a century, he was best known for playing James Garner's character's father, Joseph "Rocky" Rockford, in the NBC television series The Rockford Files (1974–1980). His father, Noah Nicholas Beery (known professionally as Noah Beery or Noah Beery Sr.) enjoyed a similarly lengthy film career as an extremely prominent supporting actor in major films, although the elder Beery was also frequently a leading man during the silent film era.

Life and career

Beery was born in New York City, New York, where his father was working as a stage actor. He was given his nickname "Pidge" by George M. Cohan's sister Josie.

The family moved to California in 1915 when his father began acting in motion pictures. After attending school in Los Angeles, they moved to a ranch in the San Fernando Valley, a style of living he would maintain for the rest of his life.

At the age of seven, he appeared with his father in The Mark of Zorro and like his father, who immediately began billing himself as "Noah Beery Sr.", he went on to become a respected character actor. His paternal uncle, Oscar-winning actor Wallace Beery, became the world's highest-paid actor by 1932. Although neither Beery Jr. nor his father ever approached that level, both had long and memorable acting careers. The three acting Beerys physically closely resembled each other, but Noah Beery Jr. lacked the powerful voice his father and uncle possessed, which is ironic since both older Beerys made major careers in silent movies.

Beery appeared in dozens of films, including a large early role as John Wayne's action partner in The Trail Beyond (1934; Wayne was 27 years old and Beery was 21), Only Angels Have Wings (1939) with Cary Grant,  20 Mule Team (1940) with his uncle Wallace Beery, and Red River (1948), again with John Wayne as well as Montgomery Clift.

Beery's early television work included a weekly stint as Joey the Clown in Circus Boy with Micky Dolenz in the mid-1950s. In 1960, Beery replaced Burt Reynolds as the co-starring sidekick on Riverboat, an NBC Western series starring Darren McGavin.

He appeared once on the religion anthology series Crossroads and on Walter Brennan's ABC sitcom, The Real McCoys. He guest-starred three times on the long-running NBC Western series The Virginian in the 1960s, and twice during the same era on Wagon Train. In 1965, he made two guest appearances on Perry Mason (murderer Tony Claus in "The Case of the Golden Venom", nine months later he played as defendant Lucas Tolliver in "The Case of the Hasty Honeymooner").

Beery portrayed the buckskin-clad recurring sidekick character "Buffalo Baker" in the 17-episode 1967 television series Hondo starring Ralph Taeger, a role played by Ward Bond in the original 3D John Wayne film. In 1970 Beery appeared as Will Baxter on the TV western The Virginian.  But Beery remains best known for his role as Joseph "Rocky" Rockford, the amiable but occasionally cantankerous father of Jim Rockford, James Garner's character on The Rockford Files (1974–1980).

Personal life
Beery Jr.'s first wife until 1966 was Maxine Jones, the only child of Western star Buck Jones. His second wife from 1968 until his death was Lisa Thorman. He had two daughters, Muffett and Melissa; a son, actor Bucklind Beery; and three step-children, Page, Sean, and Lorena Slattery.

On February 8, 1960, he received a star located at 7047 Hollywood Blvd. on the Hollywood Walk of Fame for his contributions to the television industry.

Beery died on November 1, 1994, in Tehachapi, California of a cerebral thrombosis, aged 81. He was interred in Forest Lawn Memorial Park.

Filmography

The Mutiny of the Elsinore (1920) as Boy (uncredited)
The Mark of Zorro (1920) (with Douglas Fairbanks Sr. and Noah Beery Sr.) as Boy (uncredited)
Penrod (1922) (uncredited)
Gold Diggers of Broadway (1929) as Stage Boy (uncredited)
Showgirl in Hollywood (1930) as Himself – Cameo Appearance at Premiere (uncredited)
Renegades (1930) as Young Legionnaire (uncredited)
Heroes of the West (1932) as Noah Blaine
Jungle Mystery (1932) as Fred Oakes
Rustlers' Roundup (1933) as Danny Brand
The Three Musketeers (1933, Serial) (with John Wayne) as Stubbs [Chs. 1–2, 10]
Fighting with Kit Carson (1933) (with Noah Beery Sr.) as Nakomas
Viva Villa! (1934) (scenes deleted)
The Trail Beyond  (1934) (with John Wayne and Noah Beery Sr.) as Wabi
Tailspin Tommy (1934, Serial) as Skeeter Milligan
 Five Bad Men (1935) as Gene Taggart
Devil's Canyon (1935)
The Call of the Savage (1935, Serial) as Jan Trevor
Stormy (1935) as Stormy
Tailspin Tommy in the Great Air Mystery (1935, Serial) as Skeeter Milligan
Parole! (1936) as Bobby Freeman
Ace Drummond (1936, Serial) as Jerry
The Mighty Treve (1937) as Bud McClelland
The Road Back (1937) as Wessling
Trouble at Midnight (1937) as Kirk Cameron
Some Blondes Are Dangerous (1937) as Bud Mason
Forbidden Valley (1938) as Ring Hazzard
Girls' School (1938) as George
 The Strange Case of Dr. Meade (1938) as Mart
Only Angels Have Wings (1939) (with Cary Grant and Jean Arthur) as Joe Souther
Bad Lands (1939) as Chick Lyman
Flight at Midnight (1939) as 'Torpy' McDonald
 Parents on Trial (1939) as Jerry Kearns
Of Mice and Men (1939) (with Burgess Meredith and Lon Chaney Jr.) as Whit
The Light of Western Stars (1940) as Poco
20 Mule Team (1940) (with Wallace Beery and Anne Baxter) as Mitch
 Passport to Alcatraz (1940) as Ray Nolan
The Carson City Kid (1940) as Scott 'Arizona' Warren
Riders of Death Valley (1941, Serial) as Smokey
Sergeant York (1941) (with Gary Cooper, Walter Brennan, and Joan Leslie) as Buck Lipscomb
Two in a Taxi (1941) (with Anita Louise) as Sandy Connors
Tanks a Million (1941) as Charlie Cobb
All-American Co-Ed (1941) as Slinky
Hay Foot (1942) as Sgt. Charlie Cobb
Dudes Are Pretty People (1942, Short) as Pidge Crosby
Overland Mail (1942, Serial) (with Lon Chaney Jr. and Noah Beery Sr.) as Sierra Pete
'Neath Brooklyn Bridge (1942) as Butch
Calaboose (1943) (with Mary Brian) as Pidge Crosby
Prairie Chickens (1943) (with Raymond Hatton) as Pidge Crosby
We've Never Been Licked (1943) (with Richard Quine, William Frawley and Robert Mitchum) as Cyanide Jenkins
Frontier Badmen (1943) (with Robert Paige, Anne Gwynne, Diana Barrymore and Lon Chaney Jr.) as Jim Cardwell
Top Man (1943) as Ed Thompson
Corvette K-225 (1943) as Stone
Gung Ho!: The Story of Carlson's Makin Island Raiders (1943) (with Randolph Scott and Robert Mitchum) as Kurt Richter
Week-End Pass (1944) as Johnny Adams
Follow the Boys (1944) (with George Raft, Orson Welles, and Marlene Dietrich) as Himself (uncredited)
Allergic to Love (1944) as Kip Henderson
Hi, Beautiful (1944) as Jeff Peters
Under Western Skies (1945) as Tod Howell
Her Lucky Night (1945) (with The Andrew Sisters) as Larry
See My Lawyer (1945) as Arthur Lane
The Beautiful Cheat (1945) as Prof. Alexander Haven
The Crimson Canary (1945) as Danny Brooks
The Daltons Ride Again (1945) (with Lon Chaney Jr.) as Ben Dalton
The Cat Creeps (1946) as Pidge 'Flash' Laurie
Red River (1948) (with John Wayne and Montgomery Clift) as Buster McGee
Indian Agent (1948) as Chief Red Fox
The Doolins of Oklahoma (1949) as Little Bill
Davy Crockett, Indian Scout (1950) as Tex McGee
The Savage Horde (1950) as Glenn Larrabee
Rocketship X-M (1950) (with Lloyd Bridges) as Maj. William Corrigan
Two Flags West (1950) as Cy Davis
The Last Outpost (1951, aka Cavalry Charge) (with Ronald Reagan) as Sgt. Calhoun
The Texas Rangers (1951) as Buff Smith
The Cimarron Kid (1952) (with Audie Murphy) as Bob Dalton
Wagons West (1952) (with Rod Cameron) as Arch Lawrence
The Story of Will Rogers (1952) (with Will Rogers Jr. and Jane Wyman) as Wiley Post
Tropic Zone (1953) (with Ronald Reagan and Rhonda Fleming) as Tapachula Sam
Wings of the Hawk (1953) as Pascual Orozco
War Arrow (1953) (with Maureen O'Hara and Jeff Chandler) as Sgt. Augustus Wilks
The Yellow Tomahawk (1954) as Tonio Perez
The Black Dakotas (1954) as Gimpy Joe Woods
White Feather (1955) (with Robert Wagner and Jeffrey Hunter) as Lt. Ferguson
Jubal (1956) (with Ernest Borgnine and Glenn Ford) as Sam – Horgan Rider
The Fastest Gun Alive (1956) as Dink Wells, Bank Robber
Decision at Sundown (1957) (with Randolph Scott) as Sam
Escort West (1959) as Lt. Jamison
Guns of the Timberland (1960) as Blackie
Inherit the Wind (1960) (with Spencer Tracy and Fredric March) as John Stebbins
7 Faces of Dr. Lao (1964) as Tim Mitchell
Incident at Phantom Hill (1966) (with Robert Fuller and Dan Duryea) as O'Rourke
Journey to Shiloh (1968) as Sgt. Mercer Barnes
Heaven with a Gun (1969) (with Glenn Ford) as Garvey
The Cockeyed Cowboys of Calico County (1970) as Eddie
Little Fauss and Big Halsy (1970) (with Robert Redford, Michael J. Pollard, and Lauren Hutton) as Seally Fauss
43: The Richard Petty Story (1972) as Julie
Walking Tall (1973) (with Joe Don Baker and Elizabeth Hartman) as Grandpa
The Spikes Gang (1974) (with Lee Marvin and Gary Grimes) as Basset
Walking Tall Part II (1975) as Carl Pusser
The Bastard (1978, TV Movie) (with Andrew Stevens and Kim Cattrall) as Dan O'Brien
 The Great American Traffic Jam (1980, TV Movie) as Barney
The Big Stuffed Dog (1981, TV Movie) as Petey's Grandfather
The Best Little Whorehouse in Texas (1982) (with Burt Reynolds and Dolly Parton) as Edsel
Waltz Across Texas (1982) (with Anne Archer) as Joe Locker

Television 

Rin Tin Tin (TV series) - (1954)
Circus Boy (TV series) – series – Joey (1956–1957)
Rawhide – Incident of the Chubasco – Arkansas (1959)
The Real McCoys – episode – The Investors – Claude McCoy (1961)
Wagon Train – episode – The Jonas Murdock Story – Jonas Murdock (1960)
Wagon Train – episode—Path of the Serpent – Ruddy Blaine (1961) 
Wanted: Dead or Alive – episode: "El Gato" – El Gato  (1961)
Wanted: Dead or Alive – episode: "Barney's Bounty" – Barney Durant (1961)
Route 66 – episode – 1800 Days to Justice – Emlyn Job (1962)
Gunsmoke in the S9E18 episode "Prairie Wolfer" (1964)
Wagon Train – episode – The Kate Crawley Story – Stump Beasley  (1964)
Bonanza – episode – Lotherio Larkin – Lotherio Larkin (1965)
Perry Mason – episode – The Case of the Hasty Honeymooner -Lucas Tolliver (1965) 
Lassie – episode – Danger Mountain (Season 13) as Carl Bryan (1966)
Laredo – episode – A Taste of Money – Ezekiel Fry (1966)
Combat! – episode – A Little Jazz – Hank (1967)
Hondo – 17 episodes -Buffalo Baker (1967)
Bonanza – episode – The Crime of Johnny Mule – Johnny Mule (1968)
Alias Smith and Jones – episode – Something to Get Hung About – Sheriff (1971)
Police Story – episode – The Big Walk – Hecker (1973)
The Six Million Dollar Man – episode – Run, Steve, Run – Tom Molson (1974)
The Waltons – episode – The Heritage – Charlie Harmon (1974)
The Rockford Files – 121 episodes – Joseph "Rocky" Rockford (1974–1980)
The Six Million Dollar Man – episode – The Bionic Badge – Officer Banner (1976)
Ellery Queen – episode – The Adventure of the Sinister Scenario – Lionel Briggs (1976) 
Greatest Heroes of the Bible – episode – The Story of Esther – Mordechai (1979)
Eight Is Enough – episode – Marriage and other flights of fancy (1979)
The Love Boat – episode – Celebration; Captain Papa; Honeymoon Pressure (1980)
Vega$ – episode – Sourdough Suite – Josiah Sparks (1981)
Magnum, P.I. – episode – All Roads Lead to Floyd – Floyd Lewellen (1981)
Fantasy Island – High Off the Hog/Reprisal – Otis T. Boggs (1981)
Beyond Witch Mountain (with Eddie Albert) – Uncle Ben (1982)
The Yellow Rose – 22 episodes – Luther Dillard (1983–1984)
Murder, She Wrote – episode – Funeral at Fifty-Mile – Doc Wallace (1985)
Trapper John, M.D. – episode – Buckaroo Bob Rides Again – Buckaroo Bob Morgan (1985)
The Love Boat – episode – Hello, Emily/The Tour Guide/The Winning Number – Daryl Wilcox (1986) (final appearance)

References

External links

 
 
 

1913 births
1994 deaths
American male film actors
American male television actors
Male Western (genre) film actors
Male actors from New York City
Deaths from cerebral thrombosis
20th-century American male actors
Burials at Forest Lawn Memorial Park (Hollywood Hills)
Western (genre) television actors